Japan's minimum wage depends on the region and industry. Industrial minimum wages apply for certain industries and are usually set higher than the regional minimum.  If regional and industrial minimum wages differ, the higher of the two applies. The current minimum wage is 931 yen (national weighted average). The average will rise to 961 yen (7.30 US dollars) for the 2023 fiscal year starting on 1 April 2023. This increase comes among heightened inflation and the commitment of prime minister Kishida to higher wages.

The cost of commuting, extra pay (such as working on holidays, at night, overtime, etc.) and temporary pays (bonus, tips, etc.) must be paid exclusively and cannot be used to calculate towards the minimum wage. Regional minimum hourly wages are set by the Minister of Labour or the Chief of the Prefectural Labour Standards Office. Recommendations are made by the Minimum Wage Council.

References

Minimum wage
Japanese labour law